Island Falls is a hydroelectric power station operated by SaskPower, a Saskatchewan crown corporation.

Island Falls was the first hydroelectric power plant in Saskatchewan. It was built between 1928 and 1930 by the Churchill River Power Company, a subsidiary of Hudson Bay Mining and Smelting, to provide electricity for the HBM&S mining operations at Flin Flon and Cold Lake, Manitoba.

As part of the consolidation of generation sources in the province, SaskPower purchased the plant from HBM&S in 1981, which continued to operate it for several years. Since 1985 the plant is entirely owned and operated by SaskPower.

Construction
The construction of the power plant was difficult, as transportation routes did not exist north of the rail-head in Flin Flon. In summer, 43 miles of road were built between a series of six lakes, and scows installed on those lakes. Heavy hauling had to take place during a two-month period in late winter when the lake ice was thick enough. Linn tractors. The average load was about 77 tons per train, while the total freight carried over two winters was 35,000 tons. At that time, it was considered to be the most ambitious winter hauling enterprise ever undertaken in Canada.

Power for construction was supplied by two small turbines at a temporary hydro-electric plant at Spruce Falls,  down river (east), where Kipahigan (Barrier) Lake drains into the Churchill River.

In addition, a number of earthen dams were built along the margin of the head pond (fore bay) to prevent overflow. The fore bay was filled during July 1930, completely submerging the three low falls from which Island Falls gets its name. In August 1930, A-dam was opened and the massive flood of escaping water flushed out a second channel, thus creating an island.

The power plant
The first transmission of electricity to Flin Flon took place in June 1930. In following years, additional . units were added: Unit 4 in 1936, Unit 5 in 1938, Unit 6 in 1947, and Unit 7 in 1959.

SaskPower continues to modernize and maintain the plant, with re-runnering and upgrade of controls for units 4, 5 and 6 under way as of 2012. The utility currently projects that Island Falls generating units will continue in operation into their 9th decade before retirement.

The settlement of Island Falls
From 1929 to 1967, Island Falls was also the name of the small, remote settlement of about two hundred people located on the island near the power plant. Called "The Camp" by its residents, it was home to the families of operators, electricians, machinists, administrators, labourers, and men of many other skills employed by the Churchill River Power Company.

The original buildings dating from 1929 were made from locally sawn spruce and pine trees. They were distinctively clad with vertical, bark-covered slabs on the walls, roofed with black tarpaper, insulated with sawdust, fully plumbed, and electrically heated. During the 1940s, the old dwellings were replaced by second-generation houses. These fully modern houses, including utilities, were provided free to employees.

Winters being long and cold, the community had facilities necessary for self-sufficiency, including a two-room school, gymnasium, cinema, curling rink, and hockey arena. A "Community Club" was generously supported by the company, so residents were regularly treated to movies and social gatherings. Special days such as Christmas and Dominion Day (now Canada Day) were important celebrations. Summers days were warm and long. Most people spent considerable time out-of-doors and made good use of the community boathouse. Many families had summer cottages along the river, some of which are still in use.

Transportation
Provisions such as canned and frozen foods were available at a company commissary, while fresh food was flown in by airplane. The Community had always been serviced by air, but ‘freeze-up’ of the river in the fall and ‘break-up’ of the ice in spring prevented aircraft from landing for weeks at a time. Surface transportation was essential, therefore the original route from the construction period was maintained. This route consisted of a series of lakes on which canoes and larger boats were moored. On the portages between the lakes, old vehicles were stationed. Passengers and freight could move to or from Flin Flon in about a day. The "lakes and portages" route continued to be used regularly into the 1950s.

Linn tractor trains continued to be used for transporting heavy supplies in winter over the frozen lakes, but in the 1940s much faster Bombardier snowmobiles began to carry mail and passengers. By the 1950s, many families had purchased older-style automobiles and were able to travel independently to Flin Flon for visiting, shopping and recreation. In 1967, a permanent road to Flin Flon via Pelican Narrows and the Hansen Lake Road was completed. Ironically, the community of Island Falls closed down that year.

The closing of the settlement
By 1967, when technology permitted the power plant to be run by remote control, HBM&S management decided it was no longer feasible to support the settlement near the power plant. As a result of automation, CRP Co. employees and their families were moved to jobs in Flin Flon or into retirement. Thereafter, plant operators drove to Island Falls to work their shifts and were accommodated in a staff house.

The company houses and other buildings such as the community hall remained vacant until the power plant was taken over by SaskPower in 1981. By 1988, all the buildings had been removed or demolished. Except for the two-storey commissary, which now serves as a staff house, all that remains of the settlement of Island Falls are the sidewalks leading to the places where houses once stood.

Notes
  In August 1958, the island on which the settlement stood was renamed Davis Island in honour of Rees W. Davis, an American engineer from Utah who was superintendent of the Churchill River Power Company from startup until his retirement that year.
 To a considerable extent, the power plant facilities were, and continue to be, serviced by First Nations workers from the nearby village of Sandy Bay. Most of the plant operators are now from Sandy Bay as well.

References

Marshall, M.H., Power Development at Island Falls, Churchill River, a paper presented at the Calgary Branch of The Engineering Institute of Canada, January 29, 1931.
Davis, R.W. and Huffaker, M.F., Island Falls Power Development on the Churchill River, a paper presented at the annual general meeting of the Canadian Institute of Mining and Metallurgy, Winnipeg, MB, March, 1935.
Olson, Harry, "The Story of Island Falls", Northern Lights Magazine, September 1955, published quarterly by the Hudson Bay Mining and Smelting

External links

Island Falls, Saskatchewan: 1929 - 1967
SaskPower: Island Falls Hydro Station
Saskatchewan ghost towns

Buildings and structures in Saskatchewan
Ghost towns in Saskatchewan
Hydroelectric power stations in Saskatchewan